Miyar Valley belongs to the division of Western Himalaya. It is a part of the Lahaul Range, located between Pir Panjal and Zanskar Range. The valley is nearly 75 km long and stretches between Udaipur (2649 m) and Kang La Pass (5468 m). More than 50% (568 km²) of area of the Miyar Valley (975.7 km²) is covered in glaciers Kang La at the head of Miyar valley is one of the extreme points of India.

Administration
Administratively valley belongs to the district of Lahaul and Spiti (Himachal Pradesh). Temperatures and precipitation in the Miyar Valley vary widely. The annual average values are respectively: at the mouth of the valley – Udaipur (2649 m) 9.4°C and 1057 mm; in its middle part – Sucto village (3448 m) 5°C and 605 mm; and in higher parts (alpine and nival level) average annual temperature always stays below 0°C.

Demography
According to Saini the soil cover of the Miyar Valley can be classified into three types: Himalayan Alluvial Soils (Group B), Mountain and Hill Soils, High Altitude Meadow Soil.
The valley is inhabited by Tharanga people which are influenced by Tibetan Buddhism. Only a few hundred people live concentrated in 16 villages – among others in Urgos (226), Tingrat (171), Ghumpa (45) Khanjar (48) and Sucto (37) – excluding Udayapur. Inhabitants are engaged in mainly farming and pasturing. 

Due to the belief and influence of Tibetan Buddhism, the population feeds on vegetal products and remaining lacto-vegetarians.

Economy
The economy of the valley is dominated by extensive farming. A short period of vegetation (May-September) and low-quality soils make limited production due to poor climatic and soil productivity. Among the main crops are peas, barley, buckwheat, seed potato, and also used in medicine: kuth (Saussurea lappa) and mannu (Inula racemosa). Agriculture is accompanied by typical pastoralism breeding (sheep, goats) and also mixed pastoralism and cattle breeding (cows, horses, donkeys).

Tourism
From few decades, the valley is under the influence of small size tourism.

Recently Mountaineering activity is becoming more popular in the valley. For example, in 2012 Michal Apollo, Phil Varley and Marek Zoladek made the first ascent on an unclimbed peak - they named the summit Forgotten Peak. Still, some of the peaks haven't been climbed yet.

See also 
 List of extreme points of India.

References

Valleys of Himachal Pradesh
[[Category:Geography of Lahaul and Spiti district]